Rumburak is a genus of spiders in the family Salticidae. It was first described in 2014 by Wesołowska, Azarkina & Russell-Smith. , it contains 7 species, all from South Africa.

Species
Rumburak comprises the following species:
Rumburak bellus Wesołowska, Azarkina & Russell-Smith, 2014
Rumburak hilaris Wesołowska, Azarkina & Russell-Smith, 2014
Rumburak lateripunctatus Wesołowska, Azarkina & Russell-Smith, 2014
Rumburak laxa (Zhang & Maddison, 2012)
Rumburak mirabilis Wesołowska, Azarkina & Russell-Smith, 2014
Rumburak tuberatus Wesołowska, Azarkina & Russell-Smith, 2014
Rumburak virilis Wesołowska, Azarkina & Russell-Smith, 2014

References

Endemic fauna of South Africa
Salticidae
Salticidae genera
Spiders of South Africa
Taxa named by Wanda Wesołowska